Robert Johnston McCann (15 October 1932 – 12 September 2017) was a Scottish footballer, who played as a wing half for Dundee North End, Dundee United, Queen's Park, Motherwell, Hamilton Academical and Scotland. McCann represented Scotland and the Scottish League XI five times each between 1959 and 1961.

References

External links
 

1932 births
2017 deaths
Footballers from Dundee
Association football wing halves
Scottish footballers
Dundee North End F.C. players
Dundee United F.C. players
Queen's Park F.C. players
Motherwell F.C. players
Hamilton Academical F.C. players
Scottish Football League players
Scotland international footballers
Scottish Football League representative players
Scotland amateur international footballers
Place of death missing